The 1983 Segunda División Peruana, the second division of Peruvian football (soccer), was played by 14 teams. The tournament winner, Unión Gonzales Prada.

Results

Standings

References
 Segunda division 1983
 2da division 1983
 Barcelona Surquillo

 

Peruvian Segunda División seasons
Peru2
2